Brindley Lambert Wright (born May 6, 1978) is an American former professional basketball player.

Playing career
Wright did not play organized basketball until 1993–94. He was a Top-35 recruit in the country coming out of Miami Senior High School.

He played college basketball at the University of Florida from 1997 to 2001. Wright played for Gators team that made NCAA Tournament three straight times. He was part of Florida Gators team that made 2000 NCAA Final Four.

He sued Nike after his Nike Maxair shoe ripped open during a game against Mississippi on February 21, 2001. The suit claimed the defected shoe caused permanent damage to Wright's right foot limiting his earning capacity as a professional basketball player.

Brent made a name in Europe playing with Latvian team BK Ventspils when he was named ULEB Cup regular season MVP in 2005 and helped his team to make quarterfinals of that competition. He also helped Ventspils to win Latvian championship. During the season in Ventspils there were talks about Wright seeking Latvian citizenship and playing for Latvian National Team, but plans never materialized.

He also enjoyed success in next seasons as he won championships in other countries and played in the Euroleague.

Personal
He has 18 brothers and sisters.

References

External links 
FIBA.com profile
NBA Draft 2001 profile
Euroleague.net profile
RealGM profile
DraftExpress profile

1978 births
Living people
African-American basketball players
American expatriate basketball people in Belgium
American expatriate basketball people in Croatia
American expatriate basketball people in Iran
American expatriate basketball people in Israel
American expatriate basketball people in Italy
American expatriate basketball people in Latvia
American expatriate basketball people in Russia
American expatriate basketball people in Sweden
American expatriate basketball people in Ukraine
American men's basketball players
Basketball players from Miami
BC Kyiv players
BC Oostende players
BK Ventspils players
Florida Gators men's basketball players
Greenville Groove players
KK Cibona players
Maccabi Haifa B.C. players
PBC Ural Great players
Spirou Charleroi players
Power forwards (basketball)
Miami Senior High School alumni
21st-century African-American sportspeople
20th-century African-American sportspeople